Van Oosten is a Dutch toponymic surname meaning "from the east". People with the surname include:

Ben van Oosten (born 1955), Dutch classical organist, academic and writer
Foort van Oosten (born 1977), Dutch VVD politician
Gerrit Willem van Oosten de Bruyn (1727–1797), Dutch lawyer
Gertrude van der Oosten or Geertrui van Oosten (ca.1320–1358), Dutch Beguine and mystic
Izaak van Oosten (1613–1661), Flemish landscape and cabinet painter
Keetie van Oosten-Hage (born 1949), Duth racing cyclist
Lauren van Oosten (born 1978), Canadian swimmer
Marion Van Oosten (1914–2010), American ten-pin bowler
Marsel van Oosten (born 1967), Dutch photographer
Roald van Oosten (born 1969), Composer and musician
Van Oost
Jacob van Oost (1603–1671), Flemish history and portrait painter
Jacob van Oost the Younger (1639–1713), Flemish portrait and genre painter, son of the above
 (1677–1738), Flemish portrait painter, son of the above

See also
van Osten
von der Osten

References

Dutch-language surnames
Surnames of Dutch origin
Toponymic surnames